Sight of Day is the twelfth album by English progressive rock band Mostly Autumn. As with many of the band's previous albums, the recording was funded through a pre-order campaign. Those who pre-ordered the album received a double-disc edition of the album (limited to 2000 copies), which was released on 10 February 2017. A single-disc edition of the album was made available for general release on 7 April.

Track listing

Personnel 
Mostly Autumn
 Bryan Josh – vocals, guitar, keyboards
 Olivia Sparnenn-Josh – vocals, keyboards, tambourine
 Iain Jennings – keyboards, organ
 Andy Smith – bass
 Alex Cromarty – drums, percussion
 Chris Johnson – vocals, guitar, keyboards, tambourine
 Angela Gordon – flute, whistle, recorder, backing vocals

Additional personnel
 Troy Donockley – uilleann pipes, whistle (tracks 6 & 9)
 Anna Phoebe – violins (tracks 6 & 9)

Production'''
 Bryan Josh – production, mixing
 John Spence – engineering, mastering, mixing
 Chris Johnson – production, mixing (on "Changing Lives", "Pushing Down the Floor" and "In Time")

References 

Mostly Autumn albums
2017 albums